McCarthy Island is an island,  long, lying in the entrance to King Haakon Bay on the south side of South Georgia. It was surveyed by the South Georgia Survey in the period 1951–57, and was named by the UK Antarctic Place-Names Committee after Timothy McCarthy, a seaman on the Endurance during the British expedition under Ernest Shackleton, 1914–16. McCarthy accompanied Shackleton in the James Caird from Elephant Island to King Haakon Bay.

See also 
 List of Antarctic and sub-Antarctic islands

References

Islands of South Georgia